Marxist sociology refers to the application of Marxist perspective within the study of sociology. Marxism itself can be recognized as both a political philosophy and a sociological method, insofar as it attempts to remain scientific, systematic, and objective rather than purely normative and prescriptive. Hence, Marxist sociology is "a form of conflict theory associated with…Marxism's objective of developing a positive (empirical) science of capitalist society as part of the mobilization of a revolutionary working class." 

This approach would come to facilitate the developments of critical theory and cultural studies as loosely distinct disciplines. The American Sociological Association (ASA) has a section dedicated to the issues of Marxist sociology that is "interested in examining how insights from Marxist methodology and Marxist analysis can help explain the complex dynamics of modern society."

Concepts and issues 

Marxist sociology is primarily concerned with, but not limited to, the relations between society and economics.  More specifically, key concepts in the sub-field include historical materialism, modes of production, and the capital-labour relation. Marxist sociology is also concerned with the way in which police forces are used to control indigenous populations, enslaved peoples, and the labouring poor in the name of capitalism.

Key questions asked by Marxist sociologists include:

 How does capital control workers?
 How does a mode of production influence the social class? 
 What is the relation between workers, capital, the state and culture?
 How do economic factors influence inequalities such as those relating to gender and race?
 What role do police play within Marxist socialism?

Within theoretical field, Marxist sociology is recognized as one of the major sociological paradigms and is associated with conflict and critical theory. Unlike Marxism and Marxist philosophy, Marxist sociology has put relatively little weight on creating class revolution, pursuing instead the development of an objective, politico-economic study of society rather than a critical philosophy of praxis. As such, it may be understood as a field of economic sociology. 

The study of "socio-nature" emerged from this line of thought. Socio-nature is "a concept that is used to argue that society and nature are inseparable and should not be analyzed in abstraction from each other."

Historical development 

Influenced by the thought of Karl Marx, Marxist sociology emerged around the turn of the 20th century. The first Marxist School of sociology was known as Austro-Marxism, of which Carl Grünberg and Antonio Labriola were among its most notable members. 

Much of the development in the field occurred on the outskirts of academia, pitting Marxist against "bourgeois" sociology. For some time, this division was reinforced by the Russian Revolution that then led to the creation of the Soviet Union. Soon, however, sociology found itself a victim of the suppression of "bourgeois" science within Union. While, after several decades, sociology was reestablished in the Communist states, two separate currents of thought evolved within Marxist sociology:

 Soviet Marxism: a Marxist-Leninist school that developed under 20th-century Communism (primarily the Soviet Union) to serve state interests. The school would be significantly crippled by forced adherence to the dogma of historical materialism.
 Western Marxism: a Marxist school centered on the studies of Marxism in the West. It would become accepted within Western academia during the 1940s, and would subsequently fracture into several different perspectives, such as the Frankfurt School (critical theory) 

Due to its former state-supported position, there has been a backlash against Marxist thought in post-Communist states (e.g. sociology in Poland). However, Marxist sociology is still dominant in sociological research that is sanctioned and supported by remaining Communist states (e.g. sociology in China).

References

Further reading 
 Tom B. Bottomore, Marxist sociology, Macmillan, 1975
 Martin Shaw, Marxist sociology revisited: critical assessments, Macmillan, 1985

External links 
 ASA section on Marxist sociology
 About the Section on Marxist Sociology
 Lucien Goldmann, Is There a Marxist Sociology?, International Socialism, Autumn 1968

Marxist sociology
Marxism